David Fahm is a Zambian-British film, theatre and television actor. Fahm is best known for such films and television series as Michael Winterbottom's Wonderland, Wing Commander, Code 46, Spice World, The Bill and Who Is Alice.

References

External links

Living people
British male film actors
British male television actors
British male stage actors
Zambian male actors
People from Kitwe
Zambian emigrants to the United Kingdom
Alumni of RADA
Year of birth missing (living people)